The sky often has important religious significance. Many religions, both polytheistic and monotheistic, have deities associated with the sky.

The daytime sky deities are typically distinct from the nighttime ones. Stith Thompson's Motif-Index of Folk-Literature reflects this by separating the category of "Sky-god" (A210) from that of "Star-god" (A250). In mythology, nighttime gods are usually known as night deities and gods of stars simply as star gods. Both of these categories are included here since they relate to the sky. Luminary deities are included as well since the sun and moon are located in the sky. Some religions may also have a deity or personification of the day, distinct from the god of the day lit sky, to complement the deity or personification of the night.

Daytime gods and nighttime gods are frequently deities of an "upper world" or "celestial world" opposed to the earth and a "netherworld" (gods of the underworld are sometimes called "chthonic" deities). Within Greek mythology, Uranus was the primordial sky god, who was ultimately succeeded by Zeus, who ruled the celestial realm atop Mount Olympus. In contrast to the celestial Olympians was the chthonic deity Hades, who ruled the underworld, and Poseidon, who ruled the sea.

Any masculine sky god is often also king of the gods, taking the position of patriarch within a pantheon. Such king gods are collectively categorized as "sky father" deities, with a polarity between sky and earth often being expressed by pairing a "sky father" god with an "earth mother" goddess (pairings of a sky mother with an earth father are less frequent). A main sky goddess is often the queen of the gods and may be an air/sky goddess in her own right, though she usually has other functions as well with "sky" not being her main. In antiquity, several sky goddesses in ancient Egypt, Mesopotamia, and the Near East were called Queen of Heaven. Neopagans often apply it with impunity to sky goddesses from other regions who were never associated with the term historically. 

Gods may rule the sky as a pair (for example, ancient Semitic supreme god El and the fertility goddess Asherah whom he was most likely paired with). The following is a list of sky deities in various polytheistic traditions arranged mostly by language family, which is typically a better indicator of relatedness than geography.

Speakers of Indo-European languages

Proto-Indo-European
Dyeus, the chief sky father of the Proto-Indo-European religion
Hausos, dawn goddess and daughter of Dyeus
 Menot, moon god
 Seul, sun goddess

Albanian
Perendi, god of the light, sky and heaven
Zojz, god of the sky and lightning

Baltic
 Auštaras, the god of the northeast wind
Dievs, the god of the day-lit sky and the chief god in Latvian mythology
 Vejopatis, the god of the wind who guards the divine realm of Dausos

Celtic
 Latobius, sky and mountain god equated with the Greek gods Zeus and Ares
 Nuada, god of the sky, wind, and war
 Sulis, goddess of the hot springs at Bath; probably originally the pan-Celtic sun goddess
 Ambisagrus, Cisalpine god of rain, sky and hail equated to the Roman god Jupiter

English
 Nuit, goddess of "Infinite Space and Infinite Stars" in Thelema

Germanic
Dagr, personification of day
Eostre, spring and fertility goddess; originally the Germanic dawn goddess 
Mēnô, the moon
Nótt, personification of night
Sōwilō, the sun
Teiwaz, early Germanic sky god, also the god of law, justice, and the thing (assembly)

Greek
 Aether, primeval god of the upper air
 Apollo, god of the sun, archery, prophecy, medicine, plagues...
 Astraeus, dusk god
 Eos, dawn goddess
 Helios, personification of the sun
 Hemera, primordial goddess of day
 Hera, goddess of the air, marriage, women, women's fertility, childbirth, heirs, kings, and empires
 Iris, goddess of the rainbow and messenger of Hera
 Nephele, cloud nymph in Hera's likeness
 Nyx, primordial goddess of night
 Selene, personification of the moon
 Uranus, primeval god of the sky
 Zeus, king of the gods, ruler of Mount Olympus, god of the sky, weather, law, order, and civilization

Hindu
 Aditi, celestial mother of the gods
 Chandra, god of the moon
 Dyaus Pita, sky father
 Indra, king of the gods, associated with weather
 Ratri, goddess of night
 Saranyu, goddess of clouds
 Surya, god of the sun
 Ushas, goddess of dawn

Iranian
Asmān, god of sky
Māh, god of the moon
Ohrmazd, sky father, the Great God
Tīštar, god of Sirius star and Rainfall.
Xwarxšēd, god of the sun
Uša, goddess of dawn

Roman
Aurora, dawn goddess
 Caelus, personification of the sky, equivalent to the Greek Uranus
 Juno, goddess of the sky, queen of the gods, and Jupiter's wife, equivalent to the Greek Hera
 Jupiter, king of heaven and god of the sky and weather, equivalent to the Greek Zeus
 Luna, moon goddess
 Nox, Roman version of Nyx, night goddess and mother of Discordia
 Sol, sun god
 Summanus, god of nocturnal thunder/lightning

Slavic
 Dazhbog (or Svarog), god of the Sun
 Khors, god of the Moon
 Stribog, god of the winds, sky, and air
 Perun, god of the thunderstorms, lightning and sky.
 Triglav, a triple god whose three heads represent sky, earth, and underworld
 Zorya, goddess of dawn

Thracian and Phrygian
 Sabazios, sky father

Speakers of Afro-Asiatic languages

Ancient Egyptian
 Amun, god of creation and the wind
 Anhur, originally a foreign war god who became associated with the air god, Shu
 Hathor, originally a sky goddess
 Horus, god of the sun, sky, kings, and war
 Khonsu, moon god
 Mehet-Weret, goddess of the sky
 Nut, goddess of the sky
 Ra, god of the sun
 Shu, god of the air
 Thoth, originally a moon god, later became a writing/knowledge god and the scribe of the other gods

Berber
 Achamán, Guanche creator and sky god
 Achuhucanac, Guanche rain god, associated with the sky god Achamán

Semitic

 Asherah, sky goddess and consort of El; after the rise of Yahweh, she may have become Yahweh's consort before being demonized and the Israelite religion going monotheistic 
 Baalshamin, "Lord of the Heavens" (c.f. Armenian Barsamin)
 El (god), original sky god and sky father of the Semitic speakers (replaced by Yahweh among Israelites) 
 Yahweh, deity whose origin is unclear, but rose to prominence among the Israelites, was conflated with El, and became the sole god among them; the Bible heavily associates him with the sky

Speakers of Uralic languages

Finnic
 Ilmari, godlike smith-hero and creator of the sky.
 Ilmatar, virgin spirit of the air
 Ukko, supreme god of sky, weather, thunder, crops (harvest) and other natural things.
 Perkele, associated with Ukko by some researchers. A name for Devil in Finnish.
 Taara, Oeselian chief god of thunder and the sky

Mari
 Kugu Jumo, chief god of the sky, creator of the world, associated with a duck
 Tõlze, god of the moon
 Piambar, daughter of the sky
 Shudyr-Shamich, god of the stars
 Uzhara, god of the dawn

Mordvin
 Värde-Škaj, Mokshan supreme god of the sky
 Niškepaz, Erzyan supreme god of the sky
 Kovava, Mokshan goddess of the moon

Permic
 Inmar, Udmurt god of the heavens
 Jenmar, Komi sky and chief god, creator of the world, associated with the moose

Sami
 Horagalles, Sami god of the sky, thunder and lightning, the rainbow, weather, oceans, lakes, human life, health and well-being.
 Mano, god of the moon

Samoyedic
 Num, god of the sky

Ugric
 Num-Toorum-Aś, Ob-Ugric supreme god and ruler of the kingdom of the sky in the north

Chinese
 Yu Huang Dadi-Jade Emperor (center)
 Ziwei Dadi-polestar emperor (north)
 Changsheng Dadi-longevity emperor (south)
 Qinghua Dadi-azure-illustrious emperor (east)
 Taiji Tianhuang Dadi-ultimate heaven emperor (west)
 Chang'e, moon goddess who lives with the moon rabbit
 Shang Di, the celestial emperor
 Tien Heaven,
 Xihe (deity), sun goddess
 Zhinü, weaver of the clouds and possible dawn goddess

Twenty Four Sky Emperors (Tiandi 天帝)
 Six Tiandi of the North
 1. Bìfàn Xuánwú Tiandi
 2. Bìkōng Zhēnjì Tiandi
 3. Bìluó Yuánshǐ Tiandi
 4. Bìgě Chéngkāi Tiandi
 5. Bìyàn Zhūjǐng Tiandi
 6. Bìhóng Xūkuàng Tiandi
 Six Tiandi of the South
 7. Bìzhēn Dòngyáng Tiandi
 8. Bìyáo Jiànggōng Tiandi
 9. Bìxiá Míngsù Tiandi
 10. Bìwú Yàodòng Tiandi
 11. Bìyùn Shǐtú Tiandi
 12. Bìhào Zhēngxū Tiandi
 Six Tiandi of the West
 13. Bìshén Zhàozhì Tiandi
 14. Bìchōng Zǐyào Tiandi
 15. Bìgě Fànkōng Tiandi
 16. Bìdòng Xiáyáng Tiandi
 17. Bìhuá Kāilì Tiandi
 18. Bìfàn Míngyáo Tiandi
 Six Tiandi of the North
 19. Bìguāng Hánhuá Tiandi
 20. Bìyè Zhùyán Tiandi
 21. Bìdān Huáqì Tiandi
 22. Bìkuò Címíng Tiandi
 23. Bìlà Gēyīn Tiandi
 24. Bìxū Níngyáng Tiandi

Twenty Eight Sky Emperors (Tiandi 天帝)
 Seven Tiandi of the East
 1. Tàimíng Hùzhēn Tiandi
 2. Juéfàn Tàilíng Tiandi
 3. Húyuè Cuìxiù Tiandi
 4. Zǐdān Míngchǔ Tiandi
 5. Dòngxiá Yùzhēn Tiandi
 6. Kōngxuán Lìshǔ Tiandi
 7. Qiáotōng Zhūpǔ Tiandi
 Seven Tiandi of the South
 8. Yányú Zhēngshǐ Tiandi
 9. Jīngwéi Xiāomíng Tiandi
 10. Qìngfú Zīshàn Tiandi
 11. Suíwén Xīdù Tiandi
 12. Chángjī Lèwán Tiandi
 13. Qíhuá Bùróng Tiandi
 14. Gāolíng Dàiwú Tiandi
 Seven Tiandi of the West
 15. Zhōuyú Píngwú Tiandi
 16. Jǐngyán Tàizhēn Tiandi
 17. Lǜjǐng Shǔchén Tiandi
 18. Niúluó Pǔshì Tiandi
 19. Dìngliáng Huìzōng Tiandi
 20. Zhàolíng Sūjì Tiandi
 21. Jiǔwēi Dònghuáng Tiandi
 Seven Tiandi of the North
 22. Dìshū Guāngjìng Tiandi
 23. Zǐyí Jìhuā Tiandi
 24. Zhìdìng Yǔnlǐ Tiandi
 25. Guāngfàn Jiùzhì Tiandi
 26. Hǔ口 Zhēngbù Tiandi
 27. Bàyān Wúyuán Tiandi
 28. Dàomíng Húnxìng Tiandi

Thirty Two Sky Emperors (Tiandi 天帝)
 Eight Tiandi of the East
 1. Tàihuáng Huángzēng Tiandi
 2. Tàimíng Yùwán Tiandi
 3. Qīngmíng Hétóng Tiandi
 4. Xuántāi Píngyù Tiandi
 5. Yuánmíng Wénjǔ Tiandi
 6. Qīyào Móyí Tiandi
 7. Xūwú Yuèhéng Tiandi
 8. Tàijí Méngyì Tiandi
 Eight Tiandi of the South
 9. Chìmíng Héyáng Tiandi
 10. Xuánmíng Gōnghuá Tiandi
 11. Yàomíng Zōngpiāo Tiandi
 12. Zhúlà Huángjiā Tiandi
 13. Xūmíng Tángyào Tiandi
 14. Guànmíng Duānjìng Tiandi
 15. Xuánmíng Gōngqìng Tiandi
 16. Tàihuàn Jíyáo Tiandi
 Eight Tiandi of the West
 17. Yuánzǎi Kǒngshēng Tiandi
 18. Tàiān Huángyá Tiandi
 19. Xiǎndìng Jífēng Tiandi
 20. Shǐhuáng Xiàománg Tiandi
 21. Tàihuáng Wēngchóng Tiandi
 22. Wúsī Jiāngyóu Tiandi
 23. Shǎngshé Ruǎnlè Tiandi
 24. Wújí Tánshì Tiandi
 Eight Tiandi of the North
 25. Hàotíng Xiāodù Tiandi
 26. Yuāntōng Yuándòng Tiandi
 27. Hànchǒng Miàochéng Tiandi
 28. Xiùlè Jīnshǎng Tiandi
 29. Wúshàng Chángróng Tiandi
 30. Yùlóng Téngshèng Tiandi
 31. Lóngbiàn Fàndù Tiandi
 32.Píngyù Jiǎyì Tiandi

Sixty Four Sky Emperors (Tiandi 天帝)
 Sixteen Tiandi of the East
 1. Wǎnkōng Míngfàn Tiandi
 2. Zǐyuán Bàwú Tiandi
 3. Yānjǐng Yùxū Tiandi
 4. Chōngzhēng Dòngjí Tiandi
 5. Míngbiàn Yuánhuáng Tiandi
 6. Lǐchóng Yuānxū Tiandi
 7. Jiàozhēn Quánzhòng Tiandi
 8. Qīngwēi Huángyǔ Tiandi
 9. Jiùmíng wàngshì Tiandi
 10. Yuèfǔ Wènshí Tiandi
 11. Qìlíng Zhāopǔ Tiandi
 12. Xuánxū Guāngfàn Tiandi
 13. Shǎngjí Sìzhǒng Tiandi
 14. Yìhuā Zhēngzhèn Tiandi
 15. Gūshì Bāfàn Tiandi
 16. Jiǔyán Yùdìng Tiandi
 Sixteen Tiandi of the South
 17. Dānmó Yìhuā Tiandi
 18. Dòujiàn Xūyú Tiandi
 19. Dìguāng Wújì Tiandi
 20. Zhūlíng Yàoguāng Tiandi
 21. Zǐjǐng Duànbái Tiandi
 22. Jiàngxiān Táiyuán Tiandi
 23. Shuǎngzhì Xièshēn Tiandi
 24. Yùjiāng Sīchán Tiandi
 25. Gūhóu Lìzhēn Tiandi
 26. Gǔxuán Dàoyòng Tiandi
 27. Lǐbù Míngwēi Tiandi
 28. Shénlú Chāngyìng Tiandi
 29. Dùzhēng Kèzōng Tiandi
 30. Dàhuǒ Chìyī Tiandi
 31. Qīngdì Dòngyáo Tiandi
 32. Xuánchéng Bǎihuā Tiandi
 Sixteen Tiandi of the West
 33. Jīnlí Guāngqǐ Tiandi
 34. Jíhuáng Xuányùn Tiandi
 35. Zhōuyán Jìngpíng Tiandi
 36. Bǎosòng Róngzī Tiandi
 37. Qìngzhēn Měiyuán Tiandi
 38. Zhàiwú Shénsì Tiandi
 39. Gāojiàng Zhìhuá Tiandi
 40. Dàoqī Yánjì Tiandi
 41. Tónglì Dàochú Tiandi
 42. Dǐngshén Huàwēi Tiandi
 43. Tàiān Shùnjí Tiandi
 44. Qióngxī Yàoxiān Tiandi
 45. Zǐdū Yuèguǎng Tiandi
 46. Cuīkāng Jiéshí Tiandi
 47. Jìngbì Làmáng Tiandi
 48. Pǔhǎi Dòngjī Tiandi
 Sixteen Tiandi of the North
 49. Yúsì Tǒngzhēn Tiandi
 50. Hǔjiā Pīfāng Tiandi
 51. Qiúyuān Làyú Tiandi
 52. Jīnbái Zhēngjì Tiandi
 53. Huánglì Kǒngxiū Tiandi
 54. Yáoshū Jīnglíng Tiandi
 55. Shényín Xiāodū Tiandi
 56. Qìngzhāo Yuèfú Tiandi
 57. Chēnmíng Chúkǔ Tiandi
 58. Fēngxìn Kǎofú Tiandi
 59. Zhèngrù Bàobù Tiandi
 60. Gěnglěi Lìquán Tiandi
 61. Guǐchǔ Shǐlè Tiandi
 62. Língfù Hǎilún Tiandi
 63. Shǎngjí Xiāotán Tiandi
 64. Bìcháng Dòngyuán Tiandi

Burmese
 Akathaso, the spirits of the sky

Meitei/Sanamahism

 Sidaba Mapu, the sky god and the Supreme Deity
 Salailen (Soraren), father sky who help humans to build a civilisation
 Konthoujam Tampha Lairembi, queen of heaven
 Korouhanba, sky and sun god
 Nongshaba, celestial dragon lion
 Nongthang Leima, thunder and lightning goddess
 Pakhangba, celestial dragon god
 Taoroinai, heavenly dragon god
 Sajik (Arietis)
 Thaba (Musca)
 Thangching, ancestral God descended from the heaven
 Khongjom Nubi (Pleiades)
 Apaknga (Lunar mansions)
 Sachung Telheiba (A Orionis)
 Likla Saphaba (Orion)
 Chingcharoibi (G Geminorum)
 Chungshennubi (Cancer)

Korean
Hwanin, sky god
Hwanung, son of Hwanin

The Americas

Lakota
Anpao wichapi, the Morning Star spirit, bringer of knowledge and new beginnings
Han, the spirit of night, representative of ignorance
Hanbli Gleska, the Spotted Eagle spirit, usually regarded as Wakan Thanka
Hanwi, the moon spirit of knowledge, feminine power, sometimes considered to be the wife of Wi
Mahgpia Oyate, the Cloud People, also known as the Wichapi Oyate (Star People)
Wohpe, the spirit of meteors or falling stars (often confused with Fallen Star), also the spirit of beauty, love, wishes, dreams, and prophecy
Wakinyan, thunder spirit usually taking the form of a bird
Wi, the sun spirit responsible for bringing light and wisdom to the Lakota oyate
Wichapi oyate, the Star People, each having respective powers however they usually represent knowledge to some degree
Wichapi Hinhpaya, the Fallen Star, the son of Wichapi owáŋžila and Tapun Sa Win
Wichapi owáŋžila, the Resting Star or Polaris, the widower of Tapun Sa Win (Red Cheeked Woman)

Incan
Virococha, sky god

Inuit
 Anguta, sky father and psychopomp
 Ataksak, goddess of the sky
 Negafook, god of weather systems
 Torngarsuk, god of the sky

Iroquoian
 Atahensic, Iroquois sky goddess who fell to Earth at the time of creation

Mayan
 Cabaguil, god of the sky
 Hunab Ku, sky father
 Tzacol, sky god and creator deity

Puebloans
 Ápoyan Ta'chu, sky father in Zuni mythology

Taíno mythology
 Yaya, supreme god in Taíno mythology

Speakers of Uto-Aztecan languages
 Citlalincue, goddess of the Milky Way
 Cipactonal, god of the daytime
 Oxomoco, goddess of nighttime
 Centzonmimixcoa, 400 gods of the northern stars
 Centzonhuitznahua, 400 gods of the southern stars
 Coyolxauhqui, goddess of the moon
 Meztli, goddess of the moon
 Tonatiuh, god of the sun
 Tianquiztli, star goddesses (see the Pleiades)
 Citlaltonac, god of male stars
 Citlalmina, goddess of female stars
 Citlaxonecuilli, goddess of Ursa Major
 Eototo, Hopi head kachina and sky father

Voodoo
 Badessy, Vodou loa associated with the sky

Sub-Saharan Africa
 Mulungu, Nyamwezi creator and sky god
 Nyame, Akan supreme deity, god of the sky
 Olorun, Yoruba supreme deity, god of the sky and heaven
 Shango, Yoruba sky father and thunder god
 Umvelinqangi, Zulu sky god
 Xamaba, creator and sky god of the Heikum of South Africa
 Denka, Dinka god of sky, rain and fertility
 Khonvoum, supreme creator god and sky father of Mbuti Pygmies
 Utixo, Khoikhoi sky god

Australian
 Altjira, Arrernte creator and sky god
 Baiame, southeast Australian creator and sky god
 Bila (sun), cannibalistic sun goddess
 Binbeal, god of rainbows
 Bunjil, Kulin creator and sky god
 Daramulum, one-legged emu sky god
 Numakulla, a pair of creator and sky gods
 Rainbow Serpent, creator god in many Aboriginal cultures associated with water, rain, and rainbows, though it also has a chthonic connection

Filipino

llanit: a group of Isnag sky dwellers who are helpful harvest spirits

Malagasy
 Zanahary, sky deity of Madagascar

Māori
 Ao, god of light and the sky
 Ranginui, sky father
 Tāwhaki Being of thunder and lightning
 Tāwhirimātea God of weather, storms, thunder and lightning
 Tane-rore, personification of shimmering air
 Te Uira Personification of lightning
 Whaitiri Female Personification of Thunder
 Uenuku, god of rainbows

Other Pacific Islands
 Abeguwo, Melanesian sky goddess
 Amai-te-rangi, sky demon of Mangaia
 Atua I Kafika, supreme sky god of Polynesia
 Ira, Polynesian sky goddess
 Laufakana'a, Tongan creator god and sky father
 Tangaloa, Tongan sky god

Vietnamese
 Ông Trời, sky god in Vietnamese indigenous religion
 Mẫu Cửu Trùng Thiên, she is the daughter of Ông Trời, the sister of the Mẫu Thượng Thiên, Mặt Trời, Mặt Trăng and also a goddess who rules the sky
 Mẫu Thượng Thiên, she is the daughter of Ông Trời and also one of the rulers of the sky
 Pháp Vân, cloud goddess
 Thần Mặt Trời, goddess of the sun, daughter of Ông Trời 
 Thần Mặt Trăng, goddess of the moon, daughter of Ông Trời 
 Hằng Nga, the goddess who lives on the moon with uncle Cuội and Moon Rabbit

Hurrian
 Hepit, goddess of the sky
 Teshub, god of the sky and storms

Japanese
 Amaterasu, goddess of the sun and the universe, ancestor of the emperors of Japan, and the most important deity in Shintoism
 Amenominakanushi, heavenly ancestral god
 Izanagi, creator of Japan and sky father
 Izanami, creator goddess of Japan with her husband; starts off as a sky goddess, but after she dies becomes a death/underworld/chthonic goddess
 Marici, Buddhist goddess of the heavens
 Tsukuyomi, god of the moon and brother of Amaterasu

Thai
 Phaya Thaen the sky personified with a rank equivalent to marquess (Thai Phraya,) the protagonist in a Rocket Festival

Turkic and Mongolic
 Tengri, god of the sky
 Ülgen
 Kayra

Etruscan
 Ani, primordial god of the sky identified with the Greek Uranus and Roman Caelus
 Tinia, god of the sky

Sumerian
 Anshar, god of the sky
 Anu, king of the gods, associated with the sky, heaven, and constellations
 Enlil, god of breath, air, and wind
 Utu, god of the sun

See also
 List of light deities
 List of lunar deities
 List of night deities
 List of solar deities
 Nature worship
 Sky father
 Water deity
 Wind deity

References

 
Mythological archetypes
Sky deities